Alfonso Ahumada (born 3 February 1913, date of death unknown) was a Colombian fencer. He competed in the individual épée event at the 1948 Summer Olympics.

References

External links
 

1913 births
Year of death missing
Colombian male épée fencers
Olympic fencers of Colombia
Fencers at the 1948 Summer Olympics
20th-century Colombian people